The Good Youth is the second studio album by British alternative rock band Blitz Kids and was released on 17 January 2014. It is the first full feature album through the new label Red Bull Records.

Composition and lyrics
The band themselves have described the sound of the albums as being a "better" album compared to their previous efforts.

When they streamed the full album on the Rocksound website, they described every tracks meanings, all of which are based around being an inspiring album.

Critical reception

Bring the Noise reviewer Tamsyn Wilce praised the album's range of power and soft elements, along with the cooperation of the vocals and the guitar riffs, although criticized the song Pinnacle for the poor use of vocals and "strange synths in the background", however went on to review the rest of the album positively. The review placed them along the likes of Mallory Knox, Anberlin and The Blackout.

Ourzonemags review called the album a mixture of "anthemic rock" and "pop-infused", calling them a completely different band, stating while the band has changed, there are still elements of their previous efforts still there.

Track listings

Deluxe Edition

Chart performance

References

2014 albums
Blitz Kids (band) albums
Red Bull Records albums